Arismendi (Basque for mountain of oaks) may refer to:

People
 Arismendi (surname)

Places
 Arismendi Municipality (disambiguation), several places in Venezuela
Arismendi Municipality, Barinas
Arismendi Municipality, Nueva Esparta
Arismendi Municipality, Sucre

See also
 Arizmendi, a surname